Harmony and Efficiency fraction was a parliamentary group in the 7th legislature of the Islamic Republic of Iran. 

Members of the group were fielded by the Principlists Pervasive Coalition in 2008 elections.

References 

Iranian Parliament fractions
2004 establishments in Iran
2008 disestablishments in Iran
7th legislature of the Islamic Republic of Iran